Karsten may refer to:

 Karsten, both a given name and a surname. 
 Karsten (fish), genus of fish in the family Oxudercidae.
 Karsten Creek, a golf club located near Stillwater, Oklahoma

See also 

 Carsten (disambiguation)
 Karstens (disambiguation)